The Manchurian mixed forests ecoregion (WWF ID: PA0426) covers the forested hills surrounding the river plains of northern China, Russia, North Korea, and South Korea. The ecoregion supports a number of rare species due to the relative isolation, the diversity of habitat, with mixed forests of deciduous Mongolian oak and conifers of Korean pine.  Because mountains rise above the region on three sides, with plains and wetlands below, the area supports high biodiversity as a transition zone.

Location and description 
The ecoregion occupies the middle-elevation slopes of three surrounding mountain ranges: the eastern slopes of the Greater Khingan Mountains, the southern slopes of the Lesser Khingan, and the western slopes of the Changbai Mountains. The southern section of the ecoregion surrounds the higher Changbai Mountains mixed forests ecoregion, while the middle section encircles most of the lower-elevation Northeast China Plain deciduous forests ecoregion, and the northern half of the ecoregion surrounds the lower western sector of the Amur meadow steppe ecoregion.

Climate 
The climate of the ecoregion is Humid continental climate, warm summer (Köppen climate classification (Dwb)), with a dry winter. Precipitation varies by location, ranging from 500 to 1000 mm/year. Summer and Fall are the wet season.

Flora 
Because the ecoregion ranges from 37 to 53 degrees north latitude, its forests contain more conifers than the deciduous forests to the south. On the eastern side, the most common conifers are Korean pine (Pinus koraiensis), Manchurian fir (Abies holophylla), and Siberian spruce (Picea obovata). Deciduous trees include Mongolian oak (Quercus mongolica), Manchurian ash (Fraxinus mandschurica), Amur linden (Tilia amurensis), and Manchurian elm (Ulmus laciniata). On the western side, common conifers include Scots pine (Pinus sylvestris).

Protected areas
A 2017 assessment found that 57,139 km², or 11%, of the ecoregion is in protected areas. Little forest remains outside the protected areas. Protected areas include Heishan Scenic Area, Huazishan Scenic Area, Jiguan Mountain Scenic Area, Laozumu Peak Scenic Area, Menggu Mountain Scenic Area, Wanfo Mountain Scenic Area, Xiangmoshan Scenic Area, and Xinglong National Forest Park in China, Land of the Leopard National Park in Russia, and Seoraksan National Park in South Korea.

See also 
 List of ecoregions in China

References 

Palearctic ecoregions
Ecoregions of China
Ecoregions of North Korea
Ecoregions of Russia
Ecoregions of South Korea
Temperate broadleaf and mixed forests